Badaki (also Romanized as Bādakī) is a village in Bastam Rural District, in the Central District of Chaypareh County, West Azerbaijan Province, Iran. At the 2006 census, its population was 818, in 226 families.

References 

Populated places in Chaypareh County